Punganur Assembly constituency is a constituency of Andhra Pradesh Legislative Assembly, India. It is one of 7 constituencies in Chittoor district.

Peddireddy Ramachandra Reddy of YSR Congress Party is currently representing the constituency.

Mandals

Members of Legislative Assembly

Election results

Assembly Elections 1952

Assembly Elections 2009

Assembly Elections 2014

Assembly Elections 2019

See also
 List of constituencies of Andhra Pradesh Vidhan Sabha

References 

Assembly constituencies of Andhra Pradesh